Eddie Joyce is a Canadian politician, who represents the district of Humber-Bay of Islands in the Newfoundland and Labrador House of Assembly. Originally a member of the Liberal Party, he served as the party's interim leader and the leader of the official opposition in the House of Assembly from July until November 2013. He served as a cabinet minister in the Ball government from 2015 to 2018.

He was born in Curling and was educated in Corner Brook's Memorial University campus, and at Acadia University. He won a bronze medal in boxing at the 1975 Canada Winter Games. Joyce served as chair of the Canadian Paraplegic Association. In 2000, he was elected to the Newfoundland and Labrador Soccer Hall of Fame.

Politics
Joyce was first elected in the 1989 election — however, as party leader Clyde Wells had been defeated by Lynn Verge in his own riding despite leading the Liberal Party to victory, Joyce stepped aside to allow Wells to contest the seat in a by-election. He worked in the executive offices of Wells and his successor as Premier, Brian Tobin, until the 1999 election, when he ran for office again in Bay of Islands. He won the seat and served until the 2007 election, when he was defeated by Terry Loder. In October 2010, Joyce announced that he would re-seek the Liberal nomination, and in the 2011 provincial election he defeated Loder to reclaim his old seat.

On July 18, 2013 Joyce was named Leader of the Opposition and interim Liberal leader, replacing Dwight Ball who resigned to run for the provincial leadership permanently in the party's 2013 convention. Following the Liberals forming government in the 2015 election, Joyce was named to provincial cabinet. On April 25, 2018, Joyce was formally accused of harassment by another Liberal MHA. He was subsequently removed from cabinet and caucus pending the outcome of an investigation.

On August 27, 2018, CBC released a copy of the Commissioner for Legislative Standards report regarding allegations made by fellow Liberal MHA Colin Holloway which cleared Joyce and Dale Kirby of any wrongdoing. On October 21, 2018 the Commissioner's report regarding the complaints made by Sherry Gambin-Walsh was leaked to the public. The report found that Joyce had broken the code of conduct for elected officials when he lobbied Minister Gambin-Walsh to hire a friend of his for a government job; Joyce was cleared on all other allegations. On November 16, 2018 Joyce confirmed that he had been denied re-entry into the Liberal caucus.

Joyce contested the 2019 provincial election as an independent candidate in Humber-Bay of Islands. He was re-elected as an independent. In the 2021 provincial election, Joyce was again re-elected.

Electoral record

|-

|-

|-
 
|NDP
|Tony Adey
|align="right"|625
|align="right"|11.6
|align="right"|+9.63
|}

|-

|-

|-
 
|NDP
|Charles Murphy
|align="right"|107
|align="right"|1.97
|align="right"|-1.67

|}

|-

|-

|-
 
|NDP
|Dave (Bud) Quigley
|align="right"|214 
|align="right"|3.64
|align="right"|-7.64
|}

|-

|-

|-

|NDP
|Israel Hann  
|align="right"|620
|align="right"|11.28
|align="right"|+4.43
|}

References

Liberal Party of Newfoundland and Labrador MHAs
Living people
Members of the Executive Council of Newfoundland and Labrador
21st-century Canadian politicians
Year of birth missing (living people)
Independent MHAs in Newfoundland and Labrador